Lavern Corbin (died June 10, 1965) was an American basketball player who was an NCAA All-American as a senior at Cal in 1929. A center, Corbin played three seasons of college basketball between 1926–27 and 1928–29. Cal won conference titles every one of those years, and he twice led the league in scoring. He was an All-Pacific Coast Conference selection in 1929. In high school, Corbin was a heralded player at Piedmont High School in Piedmont, California.

Corbin died of cancer on June 10, 1965, in Los Angeles.

References
General

Specific

Year of birth unknown
1965 deaths
All-American college men's basketball players
American men's basketball players
Basketball players from California
California Golden Bears men's basketball players
Centers (basketball)
People from Piedmont, California